Sqn Ldr Ajay Ahuja  ( – ) was a fighter pilot of the Indian Air Force who was killed during the Kargil War between India and Pakistan in 1999. His MiG-21 was hit by a surface-to-air missile fired by the Pakistan Army near the town of Kargil in the Indian territory of Jammu and Kashmir.  Ajay Ahuja ejected from the aircraft and parachuted to the ground. According to Indian claims, Ahuja was alive upon his landing before he was captured and subsequently killed by Pakistan troops; these claims have been rejected by Pakistan. A post-mortem report conducted on Ahuja's body after it was recovered and returned to India showed that he had a fractured knee alongside two fatal bullet wounds to his head and chest. Reports by the Indian media of Ahuja's capture and killing by Pakistani troops during the conflict sparked a major uproar within India.

Early life and military career 
Ajay Ahuja was born on 22 May 1963 in Kota, Rajasthan, India. He did his schooling from Saint Paul's Senior Secondary School, Mala Road Kota, a renowned missionary school for boys. He graduated from the Indian National Defence Academy and was commissioned as a fighter pilot in the Indian Air Force on 14 June 1985. Ahuja was promoted to the rank of squadron leader on 14 June 1996.

As a fighter pilot, he toured on the MiG-21 and the MiG-23 fighter aircraft, and gained instructional flying experience of over 1,000 hours that was spent teaching ab-initio pilots. In 1997, Ahuja was posted to the Killi Bhisiana Airbase in Bhatinda, Punjab. Shortly after his assignment to the role of flight commander with the No. 17 Squadron, the Kargil War had broken out between India and Pakistan in 1999.

Kargil War and shoot-down by Pakistani forces 
On 27 May 1999, as part of Operation Safed Sagar during Kargil War, Sqn Ldr Ahuja was undertaking a photo reconnaissance mission. Another member of the mission, Flt Lt Nachiketa ejected from his MiG-27L after an engine flame out. Sqn Ldr Ahuja stayed over enemy positions to help the rescue attempts knowing full well the existence of enemy surface-to-air missiles in the area. However, his MiG-21MF fighter, C-1539, was hit by a shoulder-fired FIM-92 Stinger. Ahuja gave a radio call – "Hercules, something has hit my plane, possibility of missile hit cannot be ruled out, I am ejecting over...(location).". IAF authorities lost track of his aircraft and all communication shortly afterward.

Circumstances of death 
According to the data released by the Indian Air Force, Ahuja's aircraft had crossed the Line of Control, a ceasefire line and pseudo-border agreed upon by India and Pakistan in the early 1970s to maintain status quo in Kashmir. It is claimed by Indian Air force that he was killed by Pakistani Soldiers after landed safely as his post-mortem report says that he had two fatal bullet injuries and fractured knee which was caused when he landed after ejection (shows that he was alive when landed), but these claims were strictly rejected by Pakistan.  Sqn Leader Ahuja's body would be recovered by the men of the 10th Battalion of the Garhwal Rifles.

Reaction and aftermath 
On 15 June 1999, Deputy High Commissioner of the Pakistani Embassy in New Delhi was summoned and a notice for the breach of Geneva conventions was submitted for the torture and killing of the prisoners of War during the Kargil War. The Government of India also lodged a protest with Pakistan's High Commissioner, accusing the Pakistani paramilitary forces of having fired at Ajay while still descending in his parachute. Pakistani authorities denied the accusations and suggested Ahuja was killed due to accidental injuries during the ejection or landing. No further investigations were carried out by either government nor impartial, outside entities and the case remains unresolved.

Return and cremation 
On 29 May 1999, Ahuja's body was flown to a local Air Force station by the Indian Air Force. Angry public demonstrations broke out there, at his cremation, and near the Pakistani embassy in Delhi.

Commemoration 

Ahuja remains a great hero for Indians, and his widow and family are often honored guests at patriotic public events and official ceremonies. The family received much support from Government authorities and Indian political leaders, as well as emotional and financial support from people across India. A statue of Ahuja was constructed by the Bhatinda-Muktsar road.

On 15 August 1999, India's 52nd anniversary of Independence, Squadron Leader Ajay Ahuja was posthumously awarded the Vir Chakra, one of India's highest gallantry honours for military personnel.

See also 
Kargil War
Military of India

References 
Notes

Indian Air Force officers
Indian aviators
People of the Kargil War
Recipients of the Vir Chakra
1963 births
1999 deaths
People from Kota, Rajasthan
Sindhi people
Indian military personnel killed in action
Aviators killed by being shot down